Open Society Institute-Baltimore is the only US field office of Open Society Foundations. It was founded in 1998. The staff and Advisory Board are based in Baltimore and all of its activities are focused locally.

OSI-Baltimore has three program areas: Criminal and Juvenile Justice, Drug Addiction Treatment, and Youth and Education Development. It also sponsors the Community Fellows Network, a corps of social innovators working in Baltimore's underserved communities.

References

Youth development organizations
Organizations based in Baltimore